Caput medusae is the appearance of distended and engorged superficial epigastric veins, which are seen radiating from the umbilicus across the abdomen. The name caput medusae (Latin for "head of Medusa") originates from the apparent similarity to Medusa's head, which had venomous snakes in place of hair. It is also a sign of portal hypertension. It is caused by dilation of the paraumbilical veins, which carry oxygenated blood from mother to fetus in utero and normally close within one week of birth, becoming re-canalised due to portal hypertension caused by liver failure.

Differential diagnosis

Inferior vena cava obstruction
 Produces abdominal collateral veins to bypass the blocked inferior vena cava and permit venous return from the legs.

Determine the direction of flow in the veins below the umbilicus. After pushing down on the prominent vein, blood will:
 flow toward the legs → caput medusae
 flow toward the head → inferior vena cava obstruction.

See also
 Portacaval anastomosis

References

External links 

Medical signs
Diseases of arteries, arterioles and capillaries